Kevin Thomas (born September 20, 1986) is a former American football cornerback. He was drafted by the Indianapolis Colts in the third round of the 2010 NFL Draft. He played college football at USC.

High school career
Thomas's prep career included being named a Super Prep All-American, Prep Star All-American, Rivals 100, Tacoma News Tribune Western 100, All-CIF Southern Section first-team, All-CIF Division IV and Los Angeles Times All-Ventura/North Coast pick as a senior defensive back and wide receiver.  During his senior year at Rio Mesa High School he recorded 81 tackles and 5 interceptions on defense and 27 receptions for 430 yards with 5 TDs on offense.

College career
In his freshman year in 2005, Thomas played in 9 games as a reserve cornerback and on special teams. In his sophomore season in 2006, Thomas was injured but played in 4 games. In his junior season in 2007, Thomas was injured and redshirted. In his redshirt junior year in 2008, Thomas played in all 13 games. In his redshirt senior year in 2009, Thomas started all 13 games and was named Second-team All-Pac-10.

Professional career

Indianapolis Colts
Thomas was drafted by the Indianapolis Colts with the 94th pick in the 2010 NFL Draft. Missed the entire 2010 season due to a knee injury.

Philadelphia Eagles
On August 2, 2012, Thomas was traded to the Philadelphia Eagles along with a conditional 2013 seventh round draft pick for linebackers Moise Fokou and Greg Lloyd, Jr.

Toronto Argonauts
On April 4, 2014, he signed with the Toronto Argonauts along with his former USC teammate, Kyle Moore. He was released by the Argonauts on June 2, 2014.

References

External links
Philadelphia Eagles bio
Indianapolis Colts bio
USC Athletic Department bio

1986 births
Living people
Sportspeople from Oxnard, California
Sportspeople from Ventura County, California
Players of American football from California
American football cornerbacks
USC Trojans football players
Indianapolis Colts players
Philadelphia Eagles players